Marie Gruber (11 June 1955 in Wuppertal, North Rhine-Westphalia – 8 February 2018) was a German actress. She appeared in more than one hundred films since 1980.

Selected filmography

References

External links 

1955 births
2018 deaths
German film actresses
Actors from Wuppertal